Macrophya is a genus of sawfly (order Hymenoptera, family Tenthredinidae).

Species

Macrophya albicincta  (Schrank, 1776) 
Macrophya albipuncta  (Fallén, 1808) 
Macrophya alboannulata  A. Costa, 1859
Macrophya annulata  (Geoffroy in Fourcroy, 1785) 
Macrophya annulicornis  Konow, 1904
Macrophya annulitibia  Takeuchi, 1933
Macrophya aphrodit e Benson, 1954
Macrophya apicalis  F. Smith, 1874
Macrophya blanda  (Fabricius, 1775) 
Macrophya carbonaria  F. Smith, 1874
Macrophya carinthiaca  (Klug, 1814) 
Macrophya chrysura  (Klug, 1817) 
Macrophya crassula  (Klug, 1814) 
Macrophya crassuliformis  Forsius, 1925
Macrophya cyrus  Benson, 1954
Macrophya diversipes  (Schrank, 1782) 
Macrophya duodecimpunctata  (Linnaeus, 1758) 
Macrophya enslini  Forsius, 1925
Macrophya erythrocnema  Costa, 1859
Macrophya erythrogaster  (Spinola, 1843) 
Macrophya esakii   (Takeuchi, 1923) 
Macrophya falsifica  Mocsary, 1909
Macrophya forsiusi  Takeuchi, 1937
Macrophya hispana  Konow, 1904
Macrophya ignava  F. Smith, 1874
Macrophya imitator  Takeuchi, 1937
Macrophya infumata  Rohwer, 1925
Macrophya kisuji  Togashi, 1974
Macrophya koreana  Takeuchi, 1937
Macrophya liukiuana  Takeuchi, 1926
Macrophya maculitibia  Takeuchi, 1933
Macrophya malaisei  Takeuchi, 1937
Macrophya marlatti  Zhelochovtsev, 1934
Macrophya mikagei  Togashi, 2005
Macrophya militaris  (Klug, 1814) 
Macrophya minerva  Benson, 1968
Macrophya montana  (Scopoli, 1763) 
Macrophya obesa Takeuchi, 1933
Macrophya parvula  Konow, 1884
Macrophya postica  (Brullé, 1832) 
Macrophya punctumalbum  (Linnaeus, 1767) 
Macrophya recognata  Zombori, 1979
Macrophya ribis  (Schrank, 1781) 
Macrophya rohweri  Forsius, 1925
Macrophya rufipes  (Linnaeus, 1758) 
Macrophya rufopicta  Enslin, 1910
Macrophya sanguinolenta  (Gmelin in Linnaeus, 1790) 
Macrophya superba  Tischbein, 1852
Macrophya tenella  Mocsáry, 1881
Macrophya teutona  (Panzer, 1799) 
Macrophya tibialis  Mocsáry, 1881
Macrophya timida  F. Smith, 1874
Macrophya tricoloripes  Mocsáry, 1881
Macrophya vitta  Enslin, 1910

References
 Li, Z.-J.; Lei, Z.; Wang, J.-F.; Wei, M.-C. 2014: Three new species of sanguinolenta-group of the genus Macrophya (Hymenoptera: Tenthredinidae) from China. Zoological systematics, 39(2): 297–308. 
 Li, Z.-J.; Liu, M.-M.; Wei, M.-C. 2014: Four new species of sanguinolenta-group of the genus Macrophya (Hymenoptera: Tenthredinidae) from China. Zoological systematics, 39(4): 520–533. 
 Wei, M.-C.; Xu, Y.; Li, Z.-J. 2013: Two new species of Macrophya korena subgroup of Macrophya sanguinolenta group (Hymenoptera, Tenthredinidae) from China. Acta zootaxonomica sinica, 38(2): 328–334. Abstract and full article (PDF)
 Zhu, X.; Li, Z.-J.; Wei, M.-C. 2012: Two new species of Macrophya Dahlbom from Shaanxi and Gansu of China (Hymenoptera, Tenthredinidae). Acta zootaxonomica sinica, 37(1): 165–170. Abstract and full article (PDF)

External links
Biolib
ION

Tenthredinidae